Jack Sharp is a former football (soccer) player who represented New Zealand at international level.

Sharp made his full New Zealand debut in a 5–6 loss to South Africa on 28 June 1947 and ended his international playing career with four A-international caps to his credit, his final cap an appearance in a 0–6 loss to Australia on 14 August 1948.

References 

Year of birth missing
Possibly living people
New Zealand association footballers
New Zealand international footballers
Stop Out players
Association footballers not categorized by position